Big Heavy Stuff was an Australian indie rock band, established in 1990 in Sydney, New South Wales. The band released four studio albums before folding in the mid-2000s, later reuniting for some select shows between 2009 and 2010. The band toured regularly with fellow Australian bands such as Powderfinger, You Am I, and Something for Kate, and were the main support on Radiohead's OK Computer tour of Australia. Big Heavy Stuff was also a support act for Dinosaur Jr., The Stone Roses, Neil Finn, and Babes in Toyland.

History
Big Heavy Stuff was initially formed by brothers Greg Atkinson (lead vocals/rhythm guitars) and Darren Atkinson (drums/backup vocals), along with Carolyn Polley (lead guitars/backup vocals) and Darren Jones (bass). Greg Atkinson had previously fronted the band Ups and Downs, which Darren Atkinson was also a member of. Ups and Downs was more pop in nature, and the two brothers formed Big Heavy Stuff to venture into the rock genre. Around the same time, Polley was the guitarist in Toys Went Berserk, and also played in Dutiful Daughters.

Big Heavy Stuff was initially signed to Volition Records, an Australian division of Sony Records. They released a string of EPs and singles from 1991 to 1993 before releasing the full-length album Truck in 1993. Afterwards, Darren Atkinson left the band and was replaced by Nick Kennedy. They then released the EP Trouble & Desire in 1994, and Jones departed from the band shortly after. He was replaced on bass by Eliot Fish. The lineup of Greg Atkinson, Polley, Kennedy, and Fish then remained constant throughout the band's existence.

The stabilized lineup released the EP Covered in Bruises in 1995, and it was the band's final release on Volition. In the U.S., "Birthday" was released as a single to promote the EP, and the single was issued by DeSoto Records (which was owned by two members of the post-hardcore band Jawbox). Big Heavy Stuff then signed with The Hypnotized Label, which was a division of Shock Records. They released their second album Maximum Sincere on Hypnotized, and four different singles were released to promote the album; however, the band's tenure on the label was short-lived. 

The band gained the attention of popular Australian alternative rock band Jebediah, who added Big Heavy Stuff to the roster of Redline Records in 2000, an independent label that Jebediah co-founded with its then-management company Naked Ape Management. The arrangement with Redline facilitated the release of the 2001 album Size of the Ocean. It contained the single "Hibernate" which reached #77 on the Hottest 100 of 2001 chart by Australian national radio station Triple J, a list that was voted on by the station's listeners. Also in 2001, Size of the Ocean was nominated in the ARIA Award for Best Adult Alternative Album category. In 2004, the band released their fourth and final album Dear Friends and Enemies, also on Redline. The album managed to peak at #94 on ARIA's Top 100 Albums chart. In 2006, after performing at the Come Together Music Festival in Luna Park Sydney, the band went on an indefinite hiatus. It was later announced that the band had dissolved on FBi Radio.

The group reunited for a show at the Factory Theatre in Marrickville, Sydney on 18 April 2009. The gig was for the That Then This Now documentary. The band reformed again to support Powderfinger on 18 September 2010 at the Sydney Entertainment Centre as part of Powderfinger's farewell tour.

Side projects
Fish has recorded as a solo artist and released a six-song EP Trick of Light on the Nonlinear label in mid-2012. Fish also reunited with Kennedy to form The Electorate with Josh Morris (Atticus), releasing an album in October 2020 called You Don't Have Time to Stay Lost on the Templebear label.

Greg Atkinson eventually formed Worker Bees with his brother Darren Atkinson. They released their self-titled debut album in 2011. From 2011 to 2017, the Atkinson brothers also reformed their earlier band Ups and Downs, and they released the full-length album The Sky's in Love With You in 2017.

Members
Greg Atkinson - lead vocals/rhythm guitars (1990–2006, 2009–2010)
Carolyn Polley - lead guitars/backup vocals (1990–2006, 2009–2010)
Nick Kennedy - drums (1993–2006, 2009–2010)
Eliot Fish - bass/backup vocals (1994–2006, 2009–2010)
Darren Jones - bass (1990–1994)
Darren Atkinson - drums (1990–1993)

Discography

Studio albums

Extended Plays

Awards and nominations

ARIA Music Awards
The ARIA Music Awards is an annual awards ceremony that recognises excellence, innovation, and achievement across all genres of Australian music. They commenced in 1987.

! 
|-
|2001
| Size of the Ocean
| ARIA Award for Best Adult Alternative Album
| 
|
|-

References

New South Wales musical groups
Musical groups established in 1990
Indie rock
Australian indie rock groups